NH 9 may refer to:

 National Highway 9 (India)
 New Hampshire Route 9, United States